Ou Xuanyi (born 23 January 1994) is a Chinese badminton player.

Career summary 
Ou made his debut in an international tournament by competing at the 2013 China Masters. In 2017, he clinched his first international title by winning the mixed doubles title at the Indonesia International Series tournament partnered with Liu Lin.

Ou started the 2018 season by competing at the Lingshui China Masters, and finished as the semi-finalist in the mixed doubles event partnered with Chen Lu. He then won the men's doubles title at the U.S. Open teamed up with Ren Xiangyu, and also the runner-up at the Singapore Open. Together with Feng Xueying, he won the mixed doubles title at the Syed Modi International, which is a Super 300 BWF tournament.

From 2022, Ou started a new partnership with the reigning Olympic silver medalist Liu Yuchen. In the Indonesia Open, the duo beat Korea's Choi Sol-gyu and Kim Won-ho to become the first men’s doubles pair from the reserves’ list to win a Super 1000 title. They qualified to compete at the World Tour Finals and emerged victorious after beating Mohammad Ahsan and Hendra Setiawan in the final. As a result he broke into the top ten for the first time in his career.

Achievements

BWF World Tour (7 titles, 6 runners-up) 
The BWF World Tour, which was announced on 19 March 2017 and implemented in 2018, is a series of elite badminton tournaments, sanctioned by Badminton World Federation (BWF). The BWF World Tour is divided into six levels, namely World Tour Finals, Super 1000, Super 750, Super 500, Super 300, and the BWF Tour Super 100.

Men's doubles

Mixed doubles

BWF International Challenge/Series (2 titles) 
Men's doubles

Mixed doubles

 BWF International Challenge tournament
 BWF International Series tournament
 BWF Future Series tournament

References

External links 
 

1994 births
Living people
Badminton players from Fujian
Chinese male badminton players